Pinsaguel is a commune in the Haute-Garonne department in southwestern France.

Geography
The commune was traversed by the rivers of the Garonne and the Ariège.

Population
The inhabitants of the commune are known as Pinsaguelois and Pinsagueloises in French.

Sights
The Château de Pinsaguel is a castle whose origins date back to the 13th century, with major building work also from the 14th and 18th centuries. It is listed as a historic site by the French Ministry of Culture.

See also
Communes of the Haute-Garonne department

References

Communes of Haute-Garonne